The following is a list of the 153 communes of the Var department of France.

The communes cooperate in the following intercommunalities (as of 2020):
Métropole d'Aix-Marseille-Provence (partly)
Métropole Toulon Provence Méditerranée
Communauté d'agglomération Dracénie Provence Verdon
CA Durance-Luberon-Verdon Agglomération (partly)
CA Estérel Côte d'Azur Agglomération
Communauté d'agglomération de la Provence Verte
Communauté d'agglomération Sud Sainte Baume
CC Cœur du Var
Communauté de communes du golfe de Saint-Tropez
Communauté de communes Lacs et Gorges du Verdon
Communauté de communes Méditerranée Porte des Maures
CC Pays de Fayence
Communauté de communes Provence Verdon
Communauté de communes de la Vallée du Gapeau

References

Var